Castle of Soto (Aller) is a castle situated in Aller, Asturias, Spain. It was declared Bien de Interés Cultural on 10 July 1975.

References

External links
 Castillo de Soto
 Conjunto Histórico Artístico Castillo de Soto y su Entorno Urbano

Castles in Asturias
Bien de Interés Cultural landmarks in Asturias